The Seychelles national football team, nicknamed The Pirates, represents Seychelles in international football and is controlled by the Seychelles Football Federation (SFF). SFF has been a member of the Confederation of African Football (CAF) since 1986, and a member of FIFA since 1986. The team's home stadium is the 10,000 capacity Stade Linité located in Roche Caiman in the outskirts of Victoria, the capital of Seychelles.

History 

Football was introduced to the Seychelles in the 1930s. Its first official competition, the Challenge Cup, was organized in 1936 then, in 1941, a championship between five teams was set up with matches of 60 minutes, played barefoot.

In 1969, the president of the Seychelles Football Federation wanted to set up a national team. Engaged on a voluntary basis, Adrian Fisher arrived on the island in September to reorganize Seychelles football. He equipped all the players with shoes, set up modern training techniques and extended the match time to 90 minutes. The newly formed national team play their first matches at a friendly tournament played in Kenya in April 1970. In Seychelles' first match played on a real football pitch, they drew 2–2 against Feisal F.C. then lost 1–2 to Mwengi at Mombasa Municipal Stadium. When Fisher left the Seychelles in 1973, the team had played six games against 4 clubs.

Seychelles play their first meeting against another selection, on March 13, 1974, against Réunion. In this friendly match, the "Pirates", the team's nickname, lost 0–2. Two years later, this time as an independent nation, the Seychelles faced Réunion again, losing 1–4. In September 1977, they played a FIFA-affiliated team, Mauritius, during a tournament played in Réunion, and lost 1–2. The team enjoyed its first victory the following year by winning at home 1–0 against Réunion.

In 1979, Seychelles played their first tournament, the 1979 Indian Ocean Games. They lost their first game 3–0 to Réunion, and won their second game 9–0 to Maldives. In the semi-final, they knocked out Mauritius 4–2 on penalties (1–1 after 90 min.), but in the final they lost 2–1 against to Réunion.

Seychelles were eliminated from the group stage at the 1985 Indian Ocean Games but, on Aug 31, 1986, they played their first competitive match recognised by FIFA and CAF, following their affiliation with both organizations, a qualification match against Mauritius for the 1987 All-Africa Games, they lost 1–2. They participated, for the first time, in the 1988 African Cup of Nations qualifiers against Mauritius but lost 1–3 over the two games.

At the 1990 Indian Ocean Games, the team suffered its heaviest defeat in its history against Madagascar in the semi-final, losing 0–6. In the bronze medal match, they won against Comoros 3–1. The team failed to repeat this performance in the following games, played at home, losing all four games and finishing last in the competition.

After the elimination from the preliminary phase of the 1996 African Cup of Nations by Mauritius 2–1 over the two legs, Vojo Gardašević was hired to lead the team. Following that, the Pirates again finished third in the 1998 Indian Ocean Games and, two years later, competed in the World Cup qualifiers for the first time. Playing against Namibia they drew 1–1 in Stade Linité, thanks to a goal by Philip Zialor but lost the second leg 0–3. Seychelles were also eliminated in the preliminary round of the 2000 African Cup of Nations by Zimbabwe 0–6 over the two matches. Seychelles fared better in the qualification for the 2004 African Cup of Nations as the team, led by Dominique Bathenay then Michael Nees, finished third and won two prestigious home wins by beating Eritrea 1–0 and Zimbabwe 2–1. Following that they achieved a bronze medal at the 2003 Indian Ocean Games, then were eliminated in the preliminary round of the 2006 World Cup by Zambia, 1–5 in the two games.

Seychelles’ biggest competitive win came against Zimbabwe in the qualifiers of the 2004 African Cup of Nations. Goals by strikers Alpha Baldé and Philip Zialor gave Seychelles a 2–1 win at Stade Linité against Zimbabwe captained by professional striker Peter Ndlovu. German coach Michael Nees was at the helm of the team at that time. Under Frenchman Dominique Bathenay, Seychelles also beat Eritrea 1–0 at Stade Linité by a goal by veteran Roddy Victor in the same qualifiers.

In 2011, Seychelles hosted the 2011 Indian Ocean Island Games and won the tournament for the first time, beating Mauritius in the final on penalties.

The rest of the 2010s saw little success for The Pirates with the high point achieved during 2017 Africa Cup of Nations qualification where they managed a 2–0 win over Lesotho and a 1–1 draw with Ethiopia to finish third in their four team group.

FIFA Goal Programme 
In 2006, a new technical centre in Mahé was opened, with help from the FIFA Goal programme. The project had a total cost of approximately 750,000 USD. James Michel, president of the Seychelles, was present at the inauguration. The technical centre houses the SFF headquarters, an auditorium, 20 bedrooms, two massage rooms, changing rooms and a restaurant. The centre is located next to the turf pitches that were also installed by the Goal programme in 2003.

Recent results and fixtures

Matches in the last 12 months, and future scheduled matches

2022

2023

Coaches
Caretaker managers are listed in italics.

 Adrian Fisher (1969–1973)
 Ulrich Mathiot (1991)
 Helmut Kosmehl (1992–1993)
 Vojo Gardašević (1997–2001)
 Dominique Bathenay (2002)
 Michael Nees (2002–2004)
 Raoul Shungu (2006–2008)
 Jan Mak (2008)
 Ulrich Mathiot (2008)
 Richard Holmlund (2009)
 Jan Mak (2010)
 Michael Nees (2010)
 Andrew Amers-Morrison (2010)
 Ralph Jean-Louis (2010–2011)
 Gavin Jeanne (2012)
 Jan Mak (2013–2014)
 Ulrich Mathiot (2014–2015)
 Bruno Saindini (2015)
 Ralph Jean-Louis (2015–2016)
 Joel de Commarmond (2017)
 Rodney Choisy (2017)
 Gavin Jeanne (2018–2019)
 Jan Mak (2019)
 Ralph Jean-Louis (2020–2021)
 Osama Haroun (2021)
 Vivian Bothe (2021–)

Players

Squad 
The following players were selected for the 2023 Africa Cup of Nations qualification match against Lesotho on 23 and 27 March 2022 respectively.

Caps and goals correct as of 31 July 2022, after the match against Madagascar.

Recent call-ups
The following players have also been called up to the Seychelles squad within the last twelve months.

INJ Withdrew due to injury
PRE Preliminary/Standby squad
RET Retired from the national team
SUS Serving suspension
WD Withdrew from the squad due to non-injury issue
COV Tested positive for COVID-19

Player records

Players in bold are still active with Seychelles.

Most appearances

Top goalscorers

Competition records

FIFA World Cup

Africa Cup of Nations

Indian Ocean Island Games

CECAFA Cup

COSAFA Cup

References

External links 
Seychelles at FIFA.com
Seychelles at CAF.com
Seychelles national football team picture

 
African national association football teams
National sports teams established in 1974